Ted Forbes was an American football coach. He served as the head football coach at the Northern Branch of the College of Agriculture—now known as the University of California, Davis (UC Davis)—from 1949 to 1953 and again in 1955, compiling a record of 24–42–8. Forbes played college football and college baseball at the University of California, Los Angeles (UCLA). He came to Davis in 1948 as an assistant coach after serving as head coach for one season at Burlingame High School in Burlingame, California.

Head coaching record

College

References

Year of birth missing
Year of death missing
American football halfbacks
Baseball second basemen
UC Davis Aggies football coaches
UCLA Bruins baseball players
UCLA Bruins football players
High school football coaches in California